Ayrton Mboko (born 23 October 1997) is a Belgian footballer who plays as a right back for Liga I side FC Botoșani.

Club career
Ayrton Mboko started his career at Standard Liège.

Union SG
In the summer of 2017, Royale Union Saint-Gilloise announced the signing of Ayrton Mboko on atwo-years deal with an option to extend for a further season.

Beerschot
On 31 August 2018, Mboko joined Beerschot.

Academica Clinceni
On 21 February 2022, Academica Clinceni announced the signing of Ayrton Mboko on a half-year contract.

Farul Constanța
In the summer 2022, Farul Constanța announced the signing of Ayrton Mboko and Jeremy Corinus on three-year contract for both. However, on 7 December 2022, Mboko was released from the club after having his contract mutually terminated.

Personal life
Mboko is born in Belgium and is of Congolese descent.

References

External links
 

1997 births
Footballers from Liège
Living people
Association football defenders
Belgian footballers
Belgian people of Democratic Republic of the Congo descent
Belgian Pro League players
Challenger Pro League players
Liga I players
Royale Union Saint-Gilloise players
K Beerschot VA players
LPS HD Clinceni players
FCV Farul Constanța players
FC Botoșani players
Belgian expatriate footballers
Expatriate footballers in Romania
Belgian expatriate sportspeople in Romania